The City of Geraldton was a local government area in the Mid West region of Western Australia,  north of the state capital, Perth on the Indian Ocean.

The council amalgamated with the Shire of Greenough, which contained Geraldton's industrial and outer suburban areas, in 2007 to form the City of Geraldton-Greenough. The area is now, as of 1 July 2011, part of the City of Greater Geraldton.

History

The City of Geraldton was first established as the Municipality of Geraldton on 21 February 1871. It gained town status as the Town of Geraldton on 1 July 1961 following the enactment of the Local Government Act 1960. It assumed its final name when it attained city status on 22 April 1988.

Amalgamation
A recommendation was made to the Minister for Local Government by the Local Government Advisory Board in August 2006 to amalgamate the City of Geraldton with the neighbouring Shire of Greenough.

The Greenough electors successfully petitioned for a referendum to determine whether amalgamation should proceed. This was held on 2 December 2006, and with a participation rate of 28.74%, a majority of 80% voted against the proposal. However, under the Local Government Act 1995 (clause 10 of Schedule 2.1) as the vote did not attract 50% of registered voters, it did not meet the requirements for a valid poll.

The councillors of both local government authorities resigned at the end of April 2007, and the first elections were held in October 2007.

Wards
The City had not been divided into wards since the 1970s, and the twelve councillors represented all electors. The mayor was directly elected.

Suburbs
 Beachlands
 Beresford
 Bluff Point
 Geraldton
 Mahomets Flats
 Mount Tarcoola (split with Shire of Greenough)
 Rangeway
 Spalding
 Sunset Beach
 Utakarra (split with Shire of Greenough)
 Webberton
 West End
 Wonthella

Mayors

Population

References

Geraldton
2007 disestablishments in Australia
Geraldton